Jimy Szymanski Ottaviano (born September 15, 1975, in Caracas) is a former tennis player from Venezuela.

He reached his highest junior world ranking of no. 1 in the world in summer 1993. He reached finals in Wimbledon Juniors 1993 and won the Italian Junior world championship in Bonfiglio Milano in 1993. He won the Junior Orange Bowl in doubles in 1993 and finished no. 3 in the juniors world ranking in 1993.

He turned professional in 1994 and reached his highest singles ATP ranking on November 15, 1999, at no. 160.
 
He played in the ATP tour for more than 10 years and had wins over Fernando González, Nicolás Lapentti, James Blake, Félix Mantilla, Olivier Rochus, Goran Ivanišević, Nicolás Pereira, Horst Skoff, Nuno Marques, Franco Squillari, Jaime Oncins, and Sébastien Lareau.

Szymanski represented his native country at the 1996 Summer Olympics in Atlanta and in 2000 Summer Olympics at Sydney.

As a coach, he worked with Milagros Sequera, Maria Kirilenko, Nadia Petrova, and was Davis Cup captain and Fed Cup captain for his native country.

He is president of STA TENNIS LLC, a company that manages tennis facilities in South Florida.

Junior Grand Slam finals

Singles: 1 (1 runner-up)

ATP Challenger and ITF Futures finals

Singles: 14 (8–6)

Doubles: 13 (4–9)

Performance timeline

Singles

External links
 
 

1975 births
Living people
Olympic tennis players of Venezuela
Tennis players from Caracas
Tennis players at the 1995 Pan American Games
Tennis players at the 1996 Summer Olympics
Tennis players at the 2000 Summer Olympics
Venezuelan male tennis players
Venezuelan people of Polish descent
Pan American Games silver medalists for Venezuela
Pan American Games bronze medalists for Venezuela
Pan American Games medalists in tennis
Competitors at the 1994 South American Games
South American Games gold medalists for Venezuela
South American Games medalists in tennis
Central American and Caribbean Games medalists in tennis
Central American and Caribbean Games gold medalists for Venezuela
Central American and Caribbean Games silver medalists for Venezuela
Central American and Caribbean Games bronze medalists for Venezuela
Tennis players at the 1991 Pan American Games
Medalists at the 1995 Pan American Games
20th-century Venezuelan people
21st-century Venezuelan people